The Edison River is a river of the Westland District of New Zealand. It arises in the Solution Range near Mount Elliot and flows north-west and north into the Mahitahi River.

See also
List of rivers of New Zealand

References

Land Information New Zealand - Search for Place Names

Westland District
Rivers of the West Coast, New Zealand
Rivers of New Zealand